This is a list of philosophers of mind.

A 
 Abhinavagupta
 G. E. M. Anscombe
 Louise Antony
 Aristotle
 David Malet Armstrong
 Saint Thomas Aquinas

B 
 Alexander Bain
 Thomas Baldwin
 Frederic Bartlett
 Gregory Bateson
 Ansgar Beckermann
 Balthasar Bekker
 Henri Bergson
 Ned Block
 Margaret Boden
 Paul Boghossian
 Emil du Bois-Reymond
 Hans-Werner Bothe
 Robert Brandom
 C. D. Broad
 Berit Brogaard
 David H. M. Brooks
 Thomas Brown
 Jerome Bruner
 Tyler Burge

C 
 Peter Carruthers
 David Chalmers
 Noam Chomsky
 Patricia Churchland
 Paul Churchland
 Andy Clark

D 
 Donald Davidson
 Petrus de Ibernia
 Daniel Dennett
 René Descartes
 Merlin Donald
 Gerhard Dorn
 Fred Dretske

E 
 Gareth Evans

F 
 Carrie Figdor
 Owen Flanagan
 Jerry Fodor
 Harry Frankfurt

G 
 Franz Joseph Gall
 Shaun Gallagher
 Robert Maximilian de Gaynesford
 Tamar Gendler
 Brie Gertler
 Arnold Geulincx
 Celia Green
 Patricia Greenspan
 Elizabeth Grosz
 Samuel Guttenplan
 Þorsteinn Gylfason

H 
 Peter Hacker
 Donna Haraway
 Gilbert Harman
 Horace Romano Harré
 David Hartley
 Friedrich Hayek
 William Hirstein
 Douglas Hofstadter
 David Hume
 Susan Hurley
 Edmund Husserl
 Edwin Hutchins
 Thomas Huxley

J 
 Frank Cameron Jackson
 William James
 Mark Johnson
 Ward Jones

K 
 Kundakunda
 Friedrich Kambartel
 Anthony Kenny
 Jaegwon Kim
 Martha Klein
 Werner Krieglstein
 Jiddu Krishnamurti

L 
 Stephen Laurence
 George Lakoff
 Timothy Leary
 Gottfried Leibniz
 Ernest Lepore
 David Kellogg Lewis
 Béatrice Longuenesse

M 
 Fiona Macpherson
 Catherine Malabou
 Nicolas Malebranche
 Merab Mamardashvili
 Humberto Maturana
 Ron McClamrock
 John McDowell
 Colin McGinn
 Alexius Meinong
 Maurice Merleau-Ponty
 Thomas Metzinger
 Ruth Millikan
 Marvin Minsky
 George Edward Moore
 Jurij Moskvitin

N 
 Thomas Nagel
 Alva Noe
 Claude Nowell

P 
 David Papineau
 John Perry
 Gualtiero Piccinini
 Ullin Place
 Karl Popper
 Hilary Putnam

R 
 Daniel N. Robinson
 Richard Rorty
 Gilbert Ryle

S 
 Susanna Schellenberg
 Tad Schmaltz
 John Searle
 Wilfrid Sellars
 Adi Shankaracharya
 Sydney Shoemaker
 Bradd Shore
 Susanna Siegel
 Aaron Sloman
 J. J. C. Smart
 David Sosa
 Baruch Spinoza
 Timothy Sprigge
 Stephen Stich
 Galen Strawson

T 
 Kenneth Allen Taylor
 Evan Thompson
 Ernst Tugendhat
 Alan Turing
 Mark Turner
 Michael Tye

U 
 Peter Unger

V 
 Francisco Varela
 Heinz von Foerster
 Ernst von Glasersfeld

W 
 John B. Watson
 Mary Warnock, Baroness Warnock
 Michael Wheeler
 Timothy Williamson
 Robert Anton Wilson
 John Wisdom
 Ludwig Wittgenstein
 Georg Henrik von Wright

Y 
 Stephen Yablo

Z 
 Dan Zahavi
 Edward N. Zalta
 Paul Ziff

References 

 
Mind